Elka Park Historic District is a national historic district located at Hunter in Greene County, New York. The district contains 31 contributing buildings, one contributing site, and one contributing structure. It is composed of a planned community of 20 seasonal houses founded and developed as small, late 19th century, summer residential enclave by wealthy German Americans.  It includes 19 summer cottages, an observation tower, and a former community carriage house converted to residential use.

It was listed on the National Register of Historic Places in 1993.

References

Historic districts on the National Register of Historic Places in New York (state)
Queen Anne architecture in New York (state)
Shingle Style architecture in New York (state)
1890s architecture in the United States
Historic districts in Greene County, New York
National Register of Historic Places in Greene County, New York